Lubań Maniowy (LKS Lubań Maniowy) is a Polish football club based in Maniowy, Nowy Targ County. They currently play in the IV Liga, the fifth tier of the Polish football league.

History 

In 1947, the initiative was to establish a Popular Sports Team (LZS) in Maniowy. First matches were held in July 1948, to which the establishment of the club is dated back. In the same year, the football team started playing in the district league.

In addition to the football section, there were also ski and hockey sections, where the latter is defunct today.

As for the football section, the best times were in the 1980s and modern times. In the 80's the club was in the then fourth tier (Liga okręgowa) and got close to getting to the third division. To further develop, a large sports ground with surrounding facilities was built. The official opening of the grounds took place on 27 July 1986, when a match against Bór Dębno was played. The hosts won 3–2.

In 2001, the team was promoted to IV Liga, then fourth tier of Polish football league.

After ten years, with the finish of the 2010/11 season, the club was promoted to the coveted third league, the new fourth tier.

With finishing 14th from 16 teams in the 2012/2013 season of the III liga, the club was relegated back to the IV Liga the fifth tier, where they stayed since.

Squad

Current coaching staff

Sources:

References

External links 
 

Nowy Targ County
Football clubs in Poland
Association football clubs established in 1948
1948 establishments in Poland